Owltan Rural District is in the Central District of Parsabad County, Ardabil province, Iran. Prior to its organization, the rural district's constituent villages were a part of the former Qeshlaq-e Shomali Rural District at the 2006 and 2011 censuses. At the most recent census of 2016, the population of Owltan Rural District was 9,261 in 2,607 households, by which time Eslamabad District had formed to absorb the rest of the former Qeshlaq-e Shomali. The largest of Owltan's 17 villages was Owltan, with 3,622 people.

References 

Parsabad County

Rural Districts of Ardabil Province

Populated places in Ardabil Province

Populated places in Parsabad County

fa:دهستان اولتان